The 2008–09 season is Hyderabad cricket team's 75th competitive season. The Hyderabad cricket team is senior men's domestic cricket team based in the city of Hyderabad, India, run by the Hyderabad Cricket Association. They represent the region of Telangana in the state of Andhra Pradesh in domestic competitions.

Competition Overview

Squads
 Head coach : Kanwaljit Singh

Kanwaljit Singh replaced Vivek Jaisimha as the Hyderabad coach ahead of the 2008–09 season.
 Irani Cup
Laxman and Ojha got selected to the Rest of India squad for the 2008 Irani Cup, a first-class cricket competition in India.

NKP Salve Challenger Trophy
Arjun Yadav got picked to the India Blue squad while Ojha and Abhinav got picked to the India Green squad for the 2008-09 NKP Salve Challenger Trophy, a List-A cricket tournament in India.

Duleep Trophy
Laxman, Ojha, Arjun Yadav and Pai got selected to the South Zone squad for the 2008-09 Duleep Trophy, a first-class cricket tournament in India. Ojha later withdrew from the tournament.

Deodhar Trophy
Pai, Ravi Teja, Shoaib Ahmed and Arjun Yadav got selected to the South Zone squad for the 2008-09 Deodhar Trophy, a List-A cricket competition in India.

Indian Premier League
The local franchise, Deccan Chargers signed Suman, Abhinav and Shoaib Ahmed while retained Laxman, Ojha, Ravi Teja, Sarvesh and Arjun Yadav for the 2009 Indian Premier League, a professional Twenty20 cricket league in India.

Ranji Trophy

The Hyderabad team, led by V. V. S. Laxman, began their campaign in the Ranji Trophy, the premier first-class cricket tournament in India, with a draw against the Orissa at Cuttack on 3 November 2008. Pragyan Ojha was ruled out due to shoulder injury ahead of the match against the Delhi. Laxman was ruled out due to heal injury ahead of their match against the Mumbai and Arjun Yadav led the team in the absence of Laxman. They finished sixth in Group A of the Super League and failed to qualify for the knockout stage with no wins, three losses and four draws.

Points Table
Super League Group A

  Top three teams advanced to knockout stage.
  Bottom team relegated to Plate League for 2009–10 Ranji Trophy.
 Points system : Win by an innings or 10 wickets = 6, Win = 5, Draw with first innings lead = 3, Draw with first innings deficit = 1, No Result = 1, Loss = 0.

Matches
Group Stage

Statistics
Most runs

 Source: Cricinfo
Most wickets

 Source: Cricinfo

Vijay Hazare Trophy
The Hyderabad team, led by Arjun Yadav, began their campaign in the Vijay Hazare Trophy, a List-A cricket tournament in India, with a win against the Kerala at Visakhapatnam on 15 February 2009. Robert Fernandez's 83 supported by half-century from Sreekumar Nair helped the Kerala post a competitive total of 247 though they lost five wickets in last ten overs but injury to S. Sreesanth and the half-centuries from Dwaraka Ravi Teja, Anoop Pai and Syed Quadri helped the Hyderabad chase the target with four wickets to spare. In the second match, steady opening partnership between Robin Uthappa and C. M. Gautam and the half-centuries from Manish Pandey and Deepak Chougule helped the Karnataka survive the late collapse off Shoaib Ahmed and post 269 in 50 overs. The Hyderabad started the chase strongly with Tirumalasetti Suman scoring 93 off 86 balls but the seven-wickets between Sunil Joshi and K. P. Appanna in the middle helped the Karnataka defeat the Hyderabad by 50 runs. The Hyderabad suffered second loss in three matches as the centuries from Subramaniam Badrinath and Vidyut Sivaramakrishnan helped the Tamil Nadu post 342 in 50 overs and the early collapse from the Hyderabad top-order led to a 92-run defeat as Shoaib Ahmed's second five-wicket haul in last two matches went in vain. The Hyderabad won their second match in this tournament as the collective batting effort from the batsmen with the half-century form Ravi Teja helped the Hyderabad post 261 in 50 overs while the three-wicket hauls from Shoaib Ahmed and Mungala Arjun restricted Goa to 155 and ensure a 105-run win for the Hyderabad. In the final zonal match, the Andhra were troubled by Shoaib Ahmed as his seven-wicket haul helped the Hyderabad bowl out the Andhra for 130 while an unbeaten half-century from Ravi Teja ensured a six-wicket win for the Hyderabad. This win helped the Hyderabad finish inside top-2 in the South Zone to advance to the knockout stage with three wins and two losses. They were eliminated in the quarter-final where lost to the Baroda by seven wickets. The Hyderabad were bowled out for 167 with the help of four-wicket haul from Ikram Zampawala and the three-wicket haul from Swapnil Singh while the half-centuries from Shailesh Solanki, Azhar Bilakhia and Rakesh Solanki helped the Baroda chase the target in 31 overs.

Points Table
South Zone

Knockout stage

Matches
Zonal Stage

Quarter-final

Statistics
Most runs

 Source: Cricinfo
Most wickets

 Source: Cricinfo

See also
 Hyderabad cricket team
 Hyderabad Cricket Association

References

External links
Hyderabad cricket team official site

Cricket in Hyderabad, India
Cricket in Telangana
Sport in Telangana